Iveleary GAA is a Gaelic Athletic Association club located in the village of Inchigeelagh, County Cork, Ireland. The club fields teams in both hurling and Gaelic football.

Honours

 Cork Intermediate A Football Championship: 2021 
 Cork Junior A Football Championship: 2020
 Mid Cork Junior A Football Championship: 1929, 1932, 1935, 1941, 1958, 1985, 2015, 2018, 2019, 2020

Notable players

 Cathal Vaughan
 Chris Óg Jones
Dominic Creedon

References

External links
Iveleary club profile

Gaelic games clubs in County Cork
Gaelic football clubs in County Cork
Hurling clubs in County Cork